is a Japanese politician of the Liberal Democratic Party, and served as a member of the House of Councillors in the Diet (national legislature). As National Public Safety Commission chairperson, Ninoyu ordered police authorities to set up an investigation panel to look into the security issues following former-premier Shinzo Abe's assassination. A native of Kyoto, Kyoto and graduate of Keio University, he was elected for the first time in 2004 after serving in the assembly of Kyoto Prefecture for five terms since 1987.

Ninoyu has served as State Minister of Internal Affairs and Communications, House of Councillors chair of Committee on Education, Culture and Science, LDP Director-General of Personnel Bureau, and Acting Chair of Party Organization and Campaign Headquarters. He is also Deputy Secretary-General of Japan-Myanmar Parliamentary Friendship Association, member of Japan-Laos Parliamentary Friendship Association, and Permanent Secretary of Japan-Philippines Parliamentary Friendship Association.

Following the assassination of former-prime minister Abe, reports have highlighted Ninoyu's connections to the Unification Church (Moon sect), including leading an executive committee for the 2018 church-linked event.

References

External links 
 Official website in Japanese.

1944 births
Living people
Keio University alumni
Members of the House of Councillors (Japan)
Liberal Democratic Party (Japan) politicians
Government ministers of Japan